List of Reptiles native to the United States by state or territory:
List of reptiles of Alabama
List of reptiles of Alaska
List of reptiles of American Samoa
List of reptiles of Arizona
List of reptiles of Arkansas
List of reptiles of California
List of reptiles of Colorado
List of reptiles of Connecticut
List of reptiles of Delaware
List of reptiles of the District of Columbia
List of reptiles of Florida
List of reptiles of Georgia
List of reptiles of Guam
List of reptiles of Hawaii
List of reptiles of Idaho
List of reptiles of Illinois
List of reptiles of Indiana
List of reptiles of Iowa
List of reptiles of Kansas
List of reptiles of Kentucky
List of reptiles of Louisiana
List of reptiles of Maine
List of reptiles of Maryland
List of reptiles of Massachusetts
List of reptiles of Michigan
List of reptiles of Minnesota
List of reptiles of Mississippi
List of reptiles of Missouri
List of reptiles of Montana
List of reptiles of Nebraska
List of reptiles of Nevada
List of reptiles of New Hampshire
List of reptiles of New Jersey
List of reptiles of New Mexico
List of reptiles of New York
List of reptiles of North Carolina
List of reptiles of North Dakota
List of reptiles of the Northern Mariana Islands
List of reptiles of Ohio
List of reptiles of Oklahoma
List of reptiles of Oregon
List of reptiles of Pennsylvania
List of reptiles of Puerto Rico
List of reptiles of Rhode Island
List of reptiles of South Carolina
List of reptiles of South Dakota
List of reptiles of Tennessee
List of reptiles of Texas
List of reptiles of the U.S. Virgin Islands
List of reptiles of Utah
List of reptiles of Vermont
List of reptiles of Virginia
List of reptiles of Washington
List of reptiles of West Virginia
List of reptiles of Wisconsin
List of reptiles of Wyoming

 
United States